Will Martinez (born August 31, 1980) is an American mixed martial artist who competed in Bellator's Featherweight division.

Background
In early 2011, Martinez opened his Brazilian jiu-jitsu, mixed martial arts and Muay Thai school, Martinez Brazilian jiu-jitsu in Philadelphia.

He is also brother of fellow mixed martial artist Jesus Martinez.

Mixed martial arts career

Early career
Martinez started his professional career in 2009. He fought only for New Jersey and Pennsylvania-based promotions, as Ring of Combat and Locked in the Cage.

In 2012, Martinez signed with Bellator.

Bellator MMA
Martinez was expected to make his promotional debut against TUF 12 competitor Andy Main on April 13, 2012 at Bellator 65. However, Martinez instead faced Terrell Hobbs at the same event. He won via submission due to a rear-naked choke in the first round.

Martinez faced Casey Johnson on September 28, 2012 at Bellator 74. He won via submission due to a rear-naked choke in the first round.

Martinez was expected to face Michael Phillips on April 4, 2013 at Bellator 95. However, Phillips was replaced by Michael Hess due to undisclosed reasons. He won via ground-and-pound knockout in the first round.

Martinez faced Kevin Roddy on November 15, 2013 at Bellator 108. He won the fight via submission due to a rear-naked choke in round one.

Martinez faced Goiti Yamauchi in the quarterfinal match of Bellator season ten featherweight tournament on February 28, 2014 at Bellator 110. He won the fight via unanimous decision.  Martinez faced Desmond Green in the tournament semifinals at Bellator 114 on March 28, 2014.  He lost the fight via unanimous decision and later announced his retirement.

Mixed martial arts record

|-
|Win
|align=center|10–3–1
|Andres Jeudi
|Decision (unanimous)
|Matrix Fights 9
|
|align=center|3
|align=center|5:00
|Philadelphia, Pennsylvania, United States
|
|-
|Loss
|align=center|9–3–1
|Desmond Green
|Decision (unanimous)
|Bellator 114
|
|align=center|3
|align=center|5:00
|West Valley City, Utah, United States
|
|-
|Win
|align=center|9–2–1
|Goiti Yamauchi
|Decision (unanimous)
|Bellator 110
|
|align=center|3
|align=center|5:00
|Uncasville, Connecticut, United States
|
|-
|Win
|align=center|8–2–1
|Kevin Roddy
|Submission (rear-naked choke)
|Bellator 108
|
|align=center|1
|align=center|3:50
|Atlantic City, New Jersey, United States
|
|-
|Win
|align=center|7–2–1
|Mervin Rodriguez
|Submission (armbar)
|Matrix Fights 8
|
|align=center|1
|align=center|2:08
|Philadelphia, Pennsylvania, United States
|
|-
|Win
|align=center|6–2–1
|Michael Hess
|KO (punches)
|Bellator 95
|
|align=center|1
|align=center|4:15
|Atlantic City, New Jersey, United States
|
|-
|Win
|align=center|5–2–1
|Casey Johnson
|Submission (rear-naked choke)
|Bellator 74
|
|align=center|1
|align=center|2:27
|Atlantic City, New Jersey, United States
|
|-
|Win
|align=center|4–2–1
|Terrell Hobbs
|Submission (rear-naked choke)
|Bellator 65
|
|align=center|1
|align=center|4:13
|Atlantic City, New Jersey, United States
|
|-
|Win
|align=center|3–2–1
|Vamana Brown
|Submission (rear-naked choke)
|Xtreme Fight Events: Cage Wars 6
|
|align=center|1
|align=center|3:32
|Chester, Pennsylvania, United States
|
|-
|Win
|align=center|2–2–1
|Neil Johnson
|KO (punch)
|Locked in the Cage 6
|
|align=center|1
|align=center|0:35
|Philadelphia, Pennsylvania, United States
|
|-
|Loss
|align=center|1–2–1
|Alexandre Bezerra
|Submission (guillotine choke)
|Locked in the Cage 4
|
|align=center|1
|align=center|1:36
|Philadelphia, Pennsylvania, United States
|
|-
|Win
|align=center|1–1–1
|Mitch Lyons
|TKO (punches)
|Matrix Fights 1
|
|align=center|2
|align=center|3:52
|Philadelphia, Pennsylvania, United States
|
|-
|Loss
|align=center|0–1–1
|Liam Kerrigan
|Submission (kneebar)
|Ring of Combat 27
|
|align=center|2
|align=center|1:07
|Atlantic City, New Jersey, United States
|
|-
|Draw
|align=center|0–0–1
|Al Iaquinta
|Draw (unanimous)
|Ring of Combat 24
|
|align=center|3
|align=center|4:00
|Atlantic City, New Jersey, United States
|

References

1980 births
Living people
American male mixed martial artists
Mixed martial artists from Pennsylvania
Featherweight mixed martial artists
Mixed martial artists utilizing Muay Thai
Mixed martial artists utilizing Brazilian jiu-jitsu
American practitioners of Brazilian jiu-jitsu
People awarded a black belt in Brazilian jiu-jitsu
American Muay Thai practitioners
Sportspeople from Philadelphia